Alexe Gilles (born January 16, 1992) is an American former competitive figure skater. Gilles is the 2008 Junior Grand Prix Final bronze medalist and the 2008 U.S. national junior champion.

Personal life 
Gilles was born in Rockford, Illinois. She graduated from Cheyenne Mountain High School in 2010. She is the sister of Piper Gilles (twin), Todd Gilles, Kemper Gilles and Shelby Gilles.

Career 
Gilles began skating at age 2. In 2000, she began working with Tom Zakrajsek and Becky Calvin in Colorado Springs, Colorado.

Gilles competed for two seasons on the JGP circuit and won a bronze medal at the 2008 ISU Junior Grand Prix Final. She also competed for two seasons on the senior Grand Prix series. On March 30, 2011, Gilles announced a coaching change to Yuka Sato and Jason Dungjen in Bloomfield Hills, Michigan.

In 2012, Gilles announced that she would compete for Canada. She finished 13th at the 2013 Canadian Championships. She never appeared for Canada internationally.

Gilles portrays Siren Number 1 and Elsa in Disney on Ice.

Programs

Competitive highlights

GP: Grand Prix; JGP: Junior Grand Prix

References

External links

 Official site
 

1992 births
Living people
American female single skaters
American people of Canadian descent
Figure skaters from Colorado Springs, Colorado
Sportspeople from Rockford, Illinois
American twins
Twin sportspeople
21st-century American women